Ddmashen is a village in the Sevan Municipality of the Gegharkunik Province of Armenia.

Etymology 
The village is also known as Totmashen and Dodmashen.

History 
The village was founded in 1828 by emigrants from Maku. The 7th-century St. Thaddeus the Apostle Church is located in the eastern part of the village.

Gallery

References

External links 

 World Gazeteer: Armenia – World-Gazetteer.com
 
 
 DDMASHEN (Gegharkunik) - Union of Communities of Armenia

Populated places in Gegharkunik Province
Populated places established in 1828